East Atlanta Santa is a mixtape by American rapper Gucci Mane. It was released on December 25, 2014, by 1017 Records and 101 Distribution. The album features guest appearances from Shawty Lo, Raury and OJ da Juiceman. The album features production from DJ Spinz, Metro Boomin, Drumma Boy, Zaytoven, Doughboy Beatz, Honorable C.N.O.T.E. and members from the 808 Mafia.

Track listing

References

2014 albums
Gucci Mane albums
Albums produced by Nard & B
Albums produced by Honorable C.N.O.T.E.
Albums produced by Southside (record producer)
Albums produced by Drumma Boy
Albums produced by Zaytoven
Albums produced by Bangladesh (record producer)
Albums produced by Metro Boomin
Albums produced by TM88